"(I Want a) Rockin' Christmas" is a Christmas song written by Jimmy Manzie and Glenn A. Baker and recorded by Australian band Ol' 55. The song was released in November 1976 and peaked at number 7 on the Australian Kent Music Report, becoming the band's second top ten single.

Track listing
 7" (K-6587)
Side A	"(I Want a) Rockin' Christmas" - 4:40
Side B "Little Saint Nick" - 3:11

Charts

Weekly Charts

Year-end charts

References

1976 songs
1976 singles
Ol' 55 (band) songs
Songs written by Jimmy Manzie
Mushroom Records singles